Habroscelimorpha is a genus of beetles in the family Cicindelidae, containing the following species:

 Habroscelimorpha auraria (Klug, 1835)
 Habroscelimorpha boops (Dejean, 1831)
 Habroscelimorpha californica (Menetries, 1843)
 Habroscelimorpha curvata (Chevrolat, 1834)
 Habroscelimorpha dorsalis (Say, 1817)
 Habroscelimorpha euryscopa (Bates, 1890)
 Habroscelimorpha gabbi (G. Horn, 1866)
 Habroscelimorpha schwarzi (W. Horn, 1923)
 Habroscelimorpha severa (Laferte, 1841)
 Habroscelimorpha wellingi Cassola & Sawada, 1990

References

Cicindelidae